Banting is a state constituency in Selangor, Malaysia, that was represented in the Selangor State Legislative Assembly from 1974 to 1995 and is currently represented in 2018.

The state constituency was created in the 1974 redistribution and was mandated to return a single member to the Selangor State Legislative Assembly under the first past the post voting system.

Demographics

History
It was abolished in 1995 when it was redistributed. 

Teluk Datuk was renamed as Banting following the redelineation exercise in 2018. Banting is currently represented in the Selangor State Legislative Assembly.

Polling districts 
According to the federal gazette issued on 30 March 2018, the Banting constituency is divided into 13 polling districts.

Representation history

Election results

References

Defunct Selangor state constituencies